The Music Master is a 1927 American silent drama film directed by Allan Dwan and written by Philip Klein, adapted from the play The Music Master by David Belasco. The film stars Alec B. Francis, Lois Moran, Neil Hamilton, Norman Trevor, Charles Lane and William T. Tilden. The film was released on January 23, 1927, by Fox Film Corporation.

Cast
Alec B. Francis as Anton von Barwig
Lois Moran as Helene Stanton
Neil Hamilton as Beverly Cruger
Norman Trevor as Andrew Cruger 
Charles Lane as Richard Stanton
William T. Tilden as Joles
Helen Chandler as Jenny
Marcia Harris as Miss Husted
Kathleen Kerrigan as Mrs. Andrew Cruger
Howard Cull as August Poons
Armand Cortez as Pinac
Leo Feodoroff as Fico
Carrie Scott as Mrs. Mangeborn
Dore Davidson as Pawnbroker
Walter Catlett as Medicine Show Barker

Preservation status
This film is now lost.

See also
1937 Fox vault fire

References

External links 
 

1927 films
1920s English-language films
Fox Film films
Lost American films
Silent American drama films
1927 drama films
Films directed by Allan Dwan
American black-and-white films
American silent feature films
American films based on plays
1927 lost films
Lost drama films
1920s American films